Robert Herrmann (born 10 August 1993) is a German footballer who plays as a left back for 3. Liga club FSV Zwickau.

References

External links
 

1993 births
Living people
People from Strausberg
German footballers
Association football midfielders
Hannover 96 II players
VfL Wolfsburg II players
SV Sandhausen players
FC Erzgebirge Aue players
Würzburger Kickers players
FSV Zwickau players
Regionalliga players
2. Bundesliga players
3. Liga players
Footballers from Brandenburg